Patkan (also Romanized as Patkān) is a village in Dehsard Rural District, in the Central District of Arzuiyeh County, Kerman Province, Iran. At the 2006 census, its population was 761, in 171 families.

References 

Populated places in Arzuiyeh County